The 1680s BC was a decade lasting from January 1, 1689 BC to December 31, 1680 BC.

Events and trends
 Egypt—Start of the Sixteenth Dynasty.
 Egypt—Development of leavened bread (date approximate).

Significant people
 1686 BC—Death of Hammurabi (short chronology)
 1684 BC—Death of Érimón, Irish legend

References